Unrest is an independent horror film directed by Jason Todd Ipson and starring Corri English, Scot Davis, Joshua Alba, Jay Jablonski, Marisa Petroro and Derrick O'Connor. It was shown at the horror film festival 8 Films To Die For during the 2006 fall season.

At the 2006 International Horror and Sci-Fi Film Festival it was awarded Best Picture for Horror, and the lead actress, English, won Best Actress.

Plot 
The film revolves around a cadaver who seems to bring misfortune on those who come in contact with it.

Although there is very little corporeal manifestation of the ghosts, people seem to die when they enrage the spirit which is linked with a special cadaver—by disrespecting it or otherwise. The story takes place mostly inside a hospital, where a young medical student, Alison Blanchard, comes to learn anatomy. By observing the cadaver she was assigned, she discovers that the body had self-inflicted wounds and also had a child. She soon discovers that there is something wrong with the cadaver, which they have nicknamed "Norma." Mysterious deaths occur in the hospital, which include the fiancee of one of Allison's team members and several hospital employees.

It is revealed that the cadaver is a person named Alita Covas, who once led an archaeological expedition on an Aztec sacrificial site. There she uncovered 50,000 bodies which were offered to Tlazolteotl, the Aztec god of fertility and prostitution. Afterwards, she herself became a prostitute, and started showing symptoms of mental imbalance. Later in her life, she committed murders and was subsequently put in a mental asylum where she died—presumably by her own hand.

Once Alison learns of the true nature of the cadaver, she decides the corpse must return to Brazil to satisfy the Aztec god. After a series of gruesome events, Alison and her classmate/love interest take Alita's now dismembered corpse and cremate her in the hospital. In the end, Alison heads to Brazil to spread the ashes in an attempt to put the spirit at rest; however, it is suggested in the final scene that the spirit remains in the hospital.

Cast 
Cast listing
 Corri English as Alison Blanchard
 Stefania Barr – Alison Blanchard (10 year old) (uncredited)
 Marisa Petroro as Alita Covas
 Ben Livingston as Ivan Verbukh
 Abner Genece as Malcolm Little
 Derrick O'Connor as Dr. Walter Blackwell
 Scot Davis as Brian Cross
 Joshua Alba as Carlos Aclar
 Jay Jablonski as Rick O'Connor
 Reb Fleming as Dr. Carolyn Saltz
 Anna Johnson as Jennifer
 J.C. Cunningham as Medical Records
 Terence Goodman as Officer
 Rhett Willman as Security

Uncredited appearances in the film include the film's producer Julio Bove as a psychiatrist, as well as Mario DeAngelis as an EMT-Specialist, Susan Duerden as Jasmin Blanchard, Christopher J. Ghhghhh as a medical student and Jerry Tracy as a highway patrolman.

Production 
The film was shot in a real morgue over the span of 24 days. The film features footage of genuine autopsys and cadavers.

Release 
Unrest saw its premiere at the SoCal Independent Film Festival on September 7, 2006. The film also played at Fantastic Fest. The film was released theatrically on November 17, 2006 by After Dark Films and Freestyle Releasing.

Home Media 
The film was released on DVD by Lionsgate Home Entertainment on March 27, 2007.

Reception  
On review aggregator Rotten Tomatoes, Unrest holds a 33% approval rating from 3 critics.

Johnny Butane of Dread Central wrote "you’ve probably not seen anything quite like Unrest before". Michael Gingold for Fangoria positively compared the film to The Gravedancers and called the film "a thoughtful and spooky little movie that stands apart from the formulas that bind so many horror films".

References

External links 
 

2006 films
2006 horror films
2000s thriller films
American independent films
American supernatural horror films
Films shot in Utah
2000s English-language films
2000s American films